Sir Baldwyn Leighton, 8th Baronet  (27 October 1836 – 22 January 1897) was an English Conservative Party politician who sat in the House of Commons from 1877 to 1885.

Leighton was the son of Sir Baldwin Leighton, 7th Baronet and his wife Mary Parker, daughter of Thomas Netherton Parker of Sweeney Hall, Shropshire. He was educated at Eton College and Christ Church, Oxford, graduating in 1859. He served in the rank of cornet in the South Salopian Yeomanry Cavalry and was a J.P. and Deputy Lieutenant for Shropshire. In 1871, he inherited the baronetcy on the death of his father. Leighton classed himself as a liberal Conservative and published several pamphlets on "Poor Law" and "Labour" for example. He also published "Letters of the late Edward Denison MP".

In August 1877, Leighton was elected at a by-election as a Member of Parliament (MP) for South Shropshire. He held the seat until the constituency was abolished in 1885.

Leighton died at the age of 60 and was buried in the parish churchyard of his family seat, Loton Park, at Alberbury, Shropshire.

Leighton married Hon. Eleanor Leicester Warren (1841-1914), daughter of George Warren, 2nd Baron de Tabley. Their son Bryan Leighton succeeded to the baronetcy. Leighton's brother Stanley Leighton was also a Shropshire MP.

Gallery

References

External links
 
 
 A portrait of Lady Leighton
 

1836 births
1897 deaths
Alumni of Christ Church, Oxford
Baronets in the Baronetage of England
Conservative Party (UK) MPs for English constituencies
Deputy Lieutenants of Shropshire
English landowners
English pamphleteers
Members of the Parliament of the United Kingdom for constituencies in Shropshire
People educated at Eton College
Shropshire Yeomanry officers
UK MPs 1874–1880
UK MPs 1880–1885
19th-century British businesspeople